Jolgeh-ye Chah Hashem Rural District is a rural district (dehestan) in Jolgeh-ye Chah Hashem District, Dalgan County, Sistan and Baluchestan province, Iran. At the 2006 census, its population was 22,644, in 4,253 families.  The rural district has 126 villages.

References 

Rural Districts of Sistan and Baluchestan Province
Dalgan County